Union Sportive du Littoral de Dunkerque is a French football club based in the commune of Dunkirk. It will compete in the Championnat National in the 2022–23 season. Their kit colours are white and blue, and they play their home matches at the Stade Marcel-Tribut.

History
The club was founded in 1909 and have never played in a higher division than Ligue 2. They have once made it to the semi-finals of the Coupe de France, in 1929, and the quarter finals four times in 1930, 1937, 1968 and 1971.

The club was promoted to Ligue 2 in 2020, when the 2019–20 Championnat National season ended prematurely, due to the COVID-19 pandemic. Dunkerque were second in the table at the time, and were promoted by the FFF executive committee. The club was relegated back to the Championnat National at the conclusion of the 2021–22 Ligue 2 season, spending two seasons in the second tier.

Name changes 

 1909–1919: Stade Dunkerquois
 1919–1927: Union Sportive Dunkerque-Malo
 1927–1934: Union Racing Dunkerque-Malo
 1934–1954: Olympique Dunkerquois
 1954–1987: Union Sportive de Dunkerque
 1987–present: Union Sportive du Littoral de Dunkerque

Honours
Division Honneur: Nord-Pas-de-Calais Group 
Champions: 1960

Current squad

Out on loan

References 

 
Football clubs in France
Association football clubs established in 1909
Usl
1909 establishments in France
Football clubs in Hauts-de-France